Jean-Paul Fernand Gabriel Bertrand-Demanes (born 13 May 1952) is a French former professional footballer who played as a goalkeeper. He earned eleven international caps for the France national team during the 1970s and was part of the France national team in the 1978 FIFA World Cup. Professionally Bertrand-Demanes spent his whole career with FC Nantes (1969–1987).

During the 1978 World Cup he played in the matches against Italy and Argentina, but was injured in the latter match after he crashed his spine against a goalpost and had to be substituted. He never played for France again.

See also
One-club man

References

External links

1952 births
Living people
Footballers from Casablanca
French footballers
Association football goalkeepers
France international footballers
1978 FIFA World Cup players
Ligue 1 players
FC Nantes players